Mladen Kašić (born 8 September 1958) is a Croatian volleyball player. He competed in the men's tournament at the 1980 Summer Olympics.

References

1958 births
Living people
Croatian men's volleyball players
Olympic volleyball players of Yugoslavia
Volleyball players at the 1980 Summer Olympics
People from Sisak